Talo Monastery is a Buddhist monastery located in the hills above Punakha, Bhutan.

External links 
 Talo Tsechu
 Talo Tshechu
 Talo Monastery
 Roof of talo monastery, Bhutan

Buddhist monasteries in Bhutan
Tibetan Buddhist monasteries
Tibetan Buddhism in Bhutan